The People's Welfare Party or Parti Kesejahteraan Insan Tanah Air (KITA) is a small political party in Malaysia, based in the state of Kelantan.

Founded as AKIM (1995)

The party was formerly known as the Malaysian People Justice Front or Angkatan Keadilan Insan Malaysia when it was founded on 16 February 1995. AKIM was founded as a splinter party of Pan-Malaysian Islamic Party in 1995 following internal disagreements by members within the party. A few members from Parti Melayu Semangat 46 also joined the fray following its dissolution in 1996. AKIM contested in the 1999 general elections for the parliamentary seats of Pasir Puteh and Kota Bharu but failed.

In 2008, the party's president, Hanafi Mamat registered itself to participate in the Permatang Pauh by-election, but only managed to catch 92 votes in the election and losing his RM 15,000 deposit in the process. Nevertheless, he hoped that the election could serve as a platform to introduce the party to the nation.

Relaunched as KITA (2011)
On 13 December 2010, AKIM announced that Datuk Zaid Ibrahim has joined its ranks as a party member, with the view of having Zaid lead and revamp AKIM into a viable political party for the coming 13th Malaysian General Elections. The party further explained that Zaid had submitted his membership application to join AKIM in Nov 2010 after his former party, Parti Keadilan Rakyat, accepted Zaid's resignation.

During the party's annual general meeting on 15 December 2010, Zaid Ibrahim was elected as the party's new president (later called "Party Chief"), taking over from Zakaria Salleh, the outgoing president of AKIM. The party also announced that it will be adopting a new name, the People's Welfare Party or Parti Kesejahteraan Insan Tanah Air.

Zaid Ibrahim also announced that KITA would be a multi-racial democratic party open to all races in Malaysia, and despite its current small size, aims to make an impact in the country's political scene by focusing on goals for the long haul. Zaid also announced that KITA's official party ideology and principles, including its new constitution, manifesto and logo, will be unveiled in Kuala Lumpur on 19 January 2011.

Zaid Ibrahim sought to dissolve KITA in February 2012, and resigned as its chief later that year due to quarrels within the party.

Presidents/Party Chief

Presidents
 1995–1998: Musa Salih
 1998–1999: Mohd Din Nizam Din (acting)
 1999–2002: Mohammad Yusoff
 2002–2009: Hanafi Mamat
 2009–2010: Zakaria Salleh

Party Chief
 2010–2012: Zaid Ibrahim
 2012–: Masrum Dayat

General election results

See also
:Category:People's Welfare Party (Malaysia) politicians

References

External links
 Zaid Untuk Rakyat
 
 Parti Kita on Twitter (2011)

Islamic political parties in Malaysia
Political parties established in 1995
Political parties in Malaysia
1995 establishments in Malaysia